Indwelling may refer to:

 Indwelling (band), a Christian hardcore metal band
 The Indwelling, a 2000 book in the Left Behind series 
 "Indwelling", an 1893 poem by Thomas Edward Brown

See also
 Indwelling catheter, a catheter left inside the body